Power Play: How Video Games Can Save the World is a nonfiction book written by Asi Burak and Laura Parker. It was first published January 31, 2017 through St. Martin's Press.

Synopsis 
Power Play's main focus is on the influence that video games can have on society. The book expands upon the future benefits and opportunities that it can provide, and attempts to redirect current stereotypes of gamers and video games to expose the positive aspects that they bring to its users. Power Play also looks into virtual reality and touches upon the innovative change that can be achieved across the world through it as well as the problems that it can solve.

The book includes a "Power Playlist" made up of the various games and tools Burak and Parker mention in Power Play. Some of these games fall into the categories of human-based computation games and neurogaming and include PeaceMaker, The Cat and the Coup, and Nanocrafter.

Reception 
GeekDad reviewed Power Play, noting that "In Power Play, Asi Burak and Laura Parker have begun the discussion of how video games are pioneering innovative social change around the world and how they might continue to affect change in the future."

References

External links
 Power Play: Trends and Opportunities in Gaming for Good Lecture with Asi Burak by Kroc School on YouTube

2017 non-fiction books
Books about video games
Collaborative non-fiction books
American non-fiction books
St. Martin's Press books